La Civica is a regionalist political party active in Trentino.

History
La Civica was founded in 2019, following the death of Rodolfo Borga, founder and leader of the Trentino Civic List, by the provincial assessor Mattia Gottardi and the provincial councilor Vanessa Masé, who considered their former party formally closed. Gottardi and Masé also explained that for structural, formal, organizational and legal reasons, the logo of the Trentino Civic List would no longer be usable for future elections.

The decision to close the former party was contested by Antonio Coradello, city councilor in Trento, who harshly criticized Gottardi and Masé and declared that the Trentino Civic List was still active.

Leadership
President: Mattia Gottardi (2019–present)

References

External links
Official website

Political parties in Trentino
Political parties established in 2019
Christian democratic parties in Italy